Monte Castelo may refer to:

Castro of Monte Castelo, a Chalcolithic archaeological site in Portugal
Monte Castelo, São Paulo, Brazil
Monte Castelo, Santa Catarina, Brazil
Santa Cruz de Monte Castelo, Paranà, Brazil
"Monte Castelo" (song) by Brazilian band Legião Urbana

See also
Battle of Monte Castello
Montecastello, town in Piedmont, Italy
Monte Castello di Vibio, town in Umbria, Italy